The 10th Massachusetts Infantry Regiment was a regiment of infantry in the Union Army during the American Civil War. Organized at Hampden Park in Springfield, Massachusetts in the early summer of 1861 and consisting mostly of men from western Massachusetts, the regiment was mustered in on June 21, 1861.  It was originally led by Colonel Henry Shaw Briggs, an attorney and prominent citizen of Pittsfield, Massachusetts.

See also 

 Massachusetts in the Civil War
 List of Massachusetts Civil War units

Notes

References

External links
10th Mass Volunteer Infantry (Reenactor Group)

Units and formations of the Union Army from Massachusetts
1861 establishments in Massachusetts
Military units and formations established in 1861
Military units and formations disestablished in 1864